"Repent, Harlequin!' Said the Ticktockman" is a science fiction short story by American writer Harlan Ellison published in 1965. It is nonlinear in that the narrative begins in the middle, then moves to the beginning, then the end, without the use of flashbacks. Stylistically, the story deliberately ignores many "rules of good writing", including a paragraph about jelly beans which is almost entirely one run-on sentence. First appearing in the science fiction magazine Galaxy in December 1965, it won the 1966 Hugo Award, the 1965 Nebula Award and the 2015 Prometheus Hall of Fame Award.

"'Repent, Harlequin!' Said the Ticktockman" was written in 1965 in a single six-hour session as a submission to a Milford Writer's Workshop the following day. A version of the story, read by Ellison, was recorded and issued on vinyl, but has long been out of print. The audio recording has since been reissued with other stories, by Blackstone Audio, under the title "The Voice From the Edge, Vol. 1". 
It was first collected in Ellison's Paingod and Other Delusions and has also appeared in several retrospective volumes of Ellison's work, including Alone Against Tomorrow, The Fantasies of Harlan Ellison, The Essential Ellison, Troublemakers and The Top of the Volcano. The story has been translated into numerous foreign languages.

Plot
The story opens with a passage from Civil Disobedience by Henry David Thoreau. The story is a satirical look at a dystopian future in which time is strictly regulated and everyone must do everything according to an extremely precise time schedule.  In this future, being late is not merely an inconvenience, but also a crime; perpetrators are punished by having their lives shortened by an amount of time equal to the delay they have caused. These punishments are administered by the Master Timekeeper, nicknamed the "Ticktockman," who uses a device called a "cardioplate" to stop the heart of any violator who has lost all the remaining time in their life through repeated violations.

The story focuses on a man named Everett C. Marm who, disguised as the anarchical Harlequin, engages in whimsical rebellion against the Ticktockman. Everett is in a relationship with a girl named Pretty Alice, who is exasperated by the fact that he is never on time. The Harlequin disrupts the carefully kept schedule of his society with methods such as distracting factory workers from their tasks by showering them with thousands of multicolored jelly beans or simply using a bullhorn to publicly encourage people to ignore their schedules, forcing the Ticktockman to pull people off their normal jobs to hunt for him.

Eventually, the Harlequin is captured. The Ticktockman tells him that Pretty Alice has betrayed him, wanting to return to the punctual society everyone else lives in. The Harlequin sneers at the Ticktockman's command for him to repent.

The Ticktockman decides not to stop the Harlequin's heart, and instead sends him to a place called Coventry, where he is converted in a manner similar to how Winston Smith is converted in George Orwell's Nineteen Eighty-Four.  The brainwashed Harlequin reappears in public and announces that he was wrong before, and that it is always good to be on time.

At the end, one of the Ticktockman's subordinates tells the Ticktockman that he is three minutes behind schedule, a fact the Ticktockman scoffs at in disbelief.

Reception
Donald A. Wollheim and Terry Carr selected the story for the World's Best Science Fiction: 1966. When reviewing the collection, Algis Budrys faulted the story as a "primitive statement ... about [the] solidly acceptable idea [that] regimentation is bad".

Copyright suit
On 15 September 2011, Ellison filed a lawsuit in federal court in California, claiming that the plot of the 2011 film In Time was based on "Repent...". The suit, naming New Regency and director Andrew Niccol as well as a number of anonymous John Does, appears to base its claim on the similarity that both the completed film and Ellison's story concern a dystopian future in which people have a set amount of time to live which can be revoked, given certain pertaining circumstances by a recognized authority known as a Timekeeper. The suit initially demanded an injunction against the film's release, though Ellison later altered his suit to instead ask for screen credit before ultimately dropping the suit, with both sides releasing the following joint statement: "After seeing the film In Time, Harlan Ellison decided to voluntarily dismiss the Action.  No payment or screen credit was promised or given to Harlan Ellison.  The parties wish each other well, and have no further comment on the matter."

See also 

 Dystopia
 In Time
 Logan's Run
 Nineteen Eighty-Four
 The Price of Life (1987 film)

References

External links
 
 

1960s science fiction works
1965 short stories
Hugo Award for Best Short Story winning works
Nebula Award for Best Short Story-winning works
Short stories by Harlan Ellison
Works originally published in Galaxy Science Fiction